Jeffrey Kalei Faine (born April 6, 1981) is a former American football center. He was drafted by the Cleveland Browns 21st overall in the 2003 NFL Draft. He played college football at Notre Dame.

Faine, a Pro Bowl alternate in 2007, has also played for the New Orleans Saints, Tampa Bay Buccaneers and Cincinnati Bengals.

Early years
Faine is a 1999 graduate of Seminole High School in Sanford, Florida.

Professional career
Faine was selected by the Cleveland Browns in the first round of the 2003 NFL Draft. On April 29, 2006, the Cleveland Browns traded Faine and a second round pick (43rd overall) during the 2006 NFL Draft to the New Orleans Saints and received a second round pick (34th overall). Faine was a Pro Bowl alternate for the 2007 Pro Bowl behind center Olin Kreutz. On February 29, 2008, Faine signed with the Tampa Bay Buccaneers. He was released by Tampa Bay on March 14, 2012. Faine was signed by the Cincinnati Bengals on August 29, 2012. He was released by the Bengals on December 6.

References

External links
Notre  Dame Fighting Irish bio
Tampa Bay Buccaneers bio

1981 births
Living people
Players of American football from Florida
Players of American football from Oregon
Sportspeople from Milwaukie, Oregon
Sportspeople from Sanford, Florida
Seminole High School (Seminole County, Florida) alumni
American football centers
Notre Dame Fighting Irish football players
Cleveland Browns players
New Orleans Saints players
Tampa Bay Buccaneers players
Cincinnati Bengals players